The Florence and Cripple Creek Railroad (F&CC) was a  narrow-gauge railroad running northward from junctions with the Denver & Rio Grande Railroad at the mill towns of Florence and later moved to Cañon City, Colorado, on the banks of the Arkansas River, up steep and narrow Phantom Canyon to the Cripple Creek Mining District, west of Pikes Peak. It was founded in 1893 and went out of business in 1915

History
Started in 1893, it was the first railroad to reach the new, booming mining district from the "outside world" and as a result it earned substantial profits in its first years. The railroad hauled people and goods into the mining district, and ore concentrates from the mines south for milling in either Florence, through a branch line to Canon City, or transfer to the D&RG for milling in Pueblo, Colorado. The F&CC's first main terminal was located in Victor, the "second city" of the district but its branch lines served many of the largest mines within the area.

Ultimately, the F&CC began to struggle financially as other competing railroads, built to the  standard gauge, Midland Terminal and Colorado Springs & Cripple Creek District Railroads entered the district from Colorado Springs from the north or east. In addition, flash floods washed out significant sections of the F&CC mainline in the narrows of Phantom Canyon several times. By the early 1900s, the railroad was in serious financial trouble and merged with other railroads of the area under the Cripple Creek Central holding company. A final, large flash flood destroyed enough of the F&CC's right-of-way to convince its new owners it was financially unwise to spend money rebuilding it; and the line was abandoned and scrapped.

In 1912, the Adelaide Phantom Canyon bridge–named for the nearby settlement of Adelaide–was abandoned. The railroad went out of business in 1915. The F&CC's well-kept motive power, twelve  Consolidation freight engines, six 4-6-0 Ten-Wheelers passenger engines, and one  engine to power commuter trains were quickly sold to other area  gauge railroads. An F&CC subsidiary, the Golden Circle Railroad, which operated  commuter routes within the district itself, continued to operate for several more years after its parent's abandonment.

Today Phantom Canyon Road, which incorporates much of the original grade for this route but has fewer crossings of the creek, is part of the Gold Belt Byway and is open to traffic for most of the summer months. The Canon City branch roughly follows County Road 123 from the Phantom Canyon Road to US 50 near Canon City.  The graded gravel Phantom Canyon road is suitable for regular cars and has a unique bent bridge.

Locomotives

See also 

 Cripple Creek & Victor Narrow Gauge Railroad

References

Further reading
 Cafky, Morris(1949?) Rails Around Gold Hill
 Feitz, Leland, Cripple Creek Railroads, 1968, Golden Bell Press
 Ferrell, M. H. (1969?). The Cripple Creek Road.
 
 
 Wilkins, Tivis E. (1976) Colorado Rail Annual No. 13: A History of the Florence & Cripple Creek Railroad

External links

 THE FLORENCE AND CRIPPLE CREEK RAILROAD from The Cripple Creek Times New Year 1903 (including postcard views)
 The History of the Florence & Cripple Creek Railroad

Former Class I railroads in the United States
Defunct Colorado railroads
Narrow gauge railroads in Colorado
3 ft gauge railways in the United States
Closed railway lines in the United States